Preventable causes of death are causes of death related to risk factors which could have been avoided. The World Health Organization has traditionally classified death according to the primary type of disease or injury. However, causes of death may also be classified in terms of preventable risk factors—such as smoking, unhealthy diet, sexual behavior, and reckless driving—which contribute to a number of different diseases. Such risk factors are usually not recorded directly on death certificates, although they are acknowledged in medical reports.

Worldwide
It is estimated that of the roughly 150,000 people who die each day across the globe, about two thirds—100,000 per day—die of age-related causes. In industrialized nations the proportion is much higher, reaching 90 percent. Thus, albeit indirectly, biological aging (senescence) is by far the leading cause of death. Whether senescence as a biological process itself can be slowed, halted, or even reversed is a subject of current scientific speculation and research.

2001 figures
Risk factors associated with the leading causes of preventable death worldwide as of the year 2001, according to researchers working with the Disease Control Priorities Network (DCPN):

By contrast, the World Health Organization (WHO)'s 2008 statistics list only causes of death, and not the underlying risk factors.

In 2001, on average 29,000 children died of preventable causes each day (that is, about 20 deaths per minute). The authors provide the context:

United States
The three risk factors most commonly leading to preventable death in the population of the United States are smoking, high blood pressure, and being overweight. Pollution from fossil fuel burning kills roughly 200,000/year.

Accidental death

Annual number of deaths and causes

Among children worldwide
Various injuries are the leading cause of death in children 9–17 years of age. In 2008, the top five worldwide unintentional injuries in children are as follows:

See also
 
 
 Short-term effects of alcohol consumption
 Long-term effects of alcohol consumption
 
 List of causes of death by rate

References

Preventable causes of death
Demography
Prevention